China Geo-Engineering Corporation (abbreviated as CGC) is a Chinese construction company that ranks in the Engineering News Record annual compilation of construction firms as one of the 250 largest international contractors by sales, with international project revenue of $665.6 million in 2012.

The company has performed work in several water related infrastructure projects across Africa.  In 2005, it won a tender against a field of 10 companies and consortia in Mozambique to build the water supply network in the cities of Xai-Xai and Chokwe.  In Zambia, the company worked on the Kabwe water and sanitation project, powering through the project despite delays by the Zambian government in disbursing counter party funding.  By the end of 2007, the government moved to fund the 1 billion Zambian kwacha in delayed payments, an action praised by the Lusaka Times in an editorial as "a very good development".  When the company started in Ghana in 2005, it started out drilling water holes and then moving on to other water projects and infrastructure.

The Ghana branch of the company is well developed with, as of 2013, about 1000 employees, 800 of whom are local, and does about $50 million in business every year.  It works on contracts in water, roads, and hospitals.

References

External links
 
 Official website of CGC International

Construction and civil engineering companies of China
Government-owned companies of China
Companies based in Beijing